Alphonse Wauters (1817–1898) was a Belgian archivist and historian.

Life
Alphonse Guillaume Ghislain Wauters was born in Brussels on 13 April 1817. He was appointed archivist of the city of Brussels on 2 April 1842. He became a correspondent of the Royal Academy of Science, Letters and Fine Arts of Belgium in 1860, and a member in 1868. In January 1886, after the death of Louis Prosper Gachard, he became the academy's secretary-treasurer. He died in Brussels on 1 May 1898.

Works
Les Délices de la Belgique, ou Description historique, pittoresque et monumentale de ce royaume (Brussels and Leipzig, 1844)
with Alexandre Henne, Histoire de Bruxelles (3 vols., Brussels, 1845)
Notice historique sur la ville de Vilvorde, son ancien château, ses institutions civiles et religieuses, ouvrage composé d'après des documents pour la plupart inédits (Brussels, 1853)
Histoire des environs de Bruxelles (10 vols., Brussels, 1855)
Le Duc Jean Ier et le Brabant sous le règne de ce prince (1267-1294) (Brussels and Liège, 1862)
Table chronologique des chartes et diplômes imprimés concernant l'histoire de la Belgique (10 vols., Brussels, 1866–1907), partly published posthumously, edited by Stanislas Bormans
De l'Origine et des premiers développements des libertés communales en Belgique, dans le Nord de la France, etc. (Brussels, 1869)
Henry III, duc de Brabant (Brussels, 1875)
Un poète du dix-neuvième siècle, Adolphe Mathieu, notice biographique (Brussels, 1880)
Documents concernant le canal de Bruxelles à Willebroeck, précédés d'une introduction contenant un résumé de l'histoire de ce canal (Brussels, 1882)
Liste par ordre chronologique des magistrats communaux de Bruxelles depuis 1794 jusqu'en 1883 (Brussels, 1884)
Inventaire des cartulaires et autres registres faisant partie des archives anciennes de la ville de Bruxelles (2 vols., Brussels, 1888–1894).
with Camille Lemonnier, Le Palais de la ville de Bruxelles à l'Exposition universelle de 1897 (Brussels, 1897)
Quelques mots sur André Vésale, ses ascendants, sa famille et sa demeure à Bruxelles (Brussels, 1898)

References

1817 births
1898 deaths
Belgian archivists
Writers from Brussels
Members of the Royal Academy of Belgium